Michelle Harrison is an American television and film actress. She is known for her role as Nora Allen / The Speed Force in the CW series The Flash, and the film Hit n' Strum.

Filmography

Film

Television

References

External links 
 
 

Living people
1975 births
American soap opera actresses
American television actresses
American film actresses
People from Puyallup, Washington
21st-century American actresses